El hombre de oro, is a Mexican telenovela that aired on  Canal 4, Telesistema Mexicano in 1960.

Cast 
 Rafael Banquells
 Magda Guzmán
 Angelines Fernández
 Beatriz Aguirre
 María Idalia
 Carlos Navarro

Production 
Original Story: Raúl Astor
Adaptation: Raúl Astor

References 

1960 telenovelas
Mexican telenovelas
Televisa telenovelas
Television shows set in Mexico
1960 Mexican television series debuts
1960 Mexican television series endings
Spanish-language telenovelas